Coarraze is a commune in the Pyrénées-Atlantiques department in south-western France. It lies in the former province of Béarn.

Due to its proximity to the town of Nay it is often normally referred to with the double barreled name "Coarraze-Nay" (such as its use in "Union sportive Coarraze Nay" or the SNCF train station "Coarraze-Nay"). Coarraze-Nay station has rail connections to Tarbes, Pau, Bordeaux and Bayonne.

Population

See also
Communes of the Pyrénées-Atlantiques department

References

Communes of Pyrénées-Atlantiques
Pyrénées-Atlantiques communes articles needing translation from French Wikipedia